The Prophet Jadur Shrine (Arabic: مقام النبي جادور) is a mosque located in Al-Salt, Jordan. According to tradition, the mosque contains a tomb of the biblical figure, Gad, who is known by the locals as Jadur, or simply Jad.

Description 
The tomb of Gad is located on top of Tel Al-Jadur, surrounded by a local cemetery. There is also a local spring called Ain al-Jadur which dates back to Roman and Byzantine periods. The mosque built over the tomb is modern, dating back to 1958.

In 2010, the site was reported to be in a poor condition. Cracks formed on the ceiling of the mosque which led to pieces of the roof falling onto the floor of the building. The attached toilets were also unusable due to the neglect and lack of repair for years.

Incidents 
The building was looted and the electrical cables were stolen from it.

References 

Mosques in Jordan